The men's 100 metre freestyle event at the 1992 Summer Olympics took place on 28 July at the Piscines Bernat Picornell in Barcelona, Spain. There were 75 competitors from 52 nations. Nations had been limited to two swimmers each since the 1984 Games. The event was won by Alexander Popov of the Unified Team. Gustavo Borges's silver was Brazil's first medal in the men's 100 metre freestyle since 1960. Stéphan Caron of France repeated as bronze medalist, the eighth man to win multiple medals in the event. It was the first time since 1968 that the United States had competed and not won the event and the first time since 1956 that the Americans had competed and not taken any medal, as Jon Olsen finished fourth and defending champion Matt Biondi came in fifth.

Background

This was the 21st appearance of the men's 100 metre freestyle. The event has been held at every Summer Olympics except 1900 (when the shortest freestyle was the 200 metres), though the 1904 version was measured in yards rather than metres.

Five of the eight finalists from the 1988 Games returned: gold medalist Matt Biondi of the United States, bronze medalist Stéphan Caron of France, fourth-place finisher Gennadiy Prigoda of the Soviet Union (now competing for the Unified Team), sixth-place finisher Andrew Baildon of Australia, and eighth-place finisher Tommy Werner of Sweden.

Biondi was the favorite, having also won the 1991 World Championship and his 1988 world record still standing. Caron and 1991 European Champion Alexander Popov were also contenders.

Albania, Lithuania, the Maldives, Saudi Arabia, and the Seychelles each made their debut in the event; some former Soviet republics competed as the Unified Team and competitors from Yugoslavia competed as Independent Olympic Participants. The United States made its 20th appearance, most of any nation, having missed only the boycotted 1980 Games.

Competition format

This freestyle swimming competition used the A/B final format instituted in 1984. The competition consisted of two rounds: heats and finals. The swimmers with the best 8 times in the semifinals advanced to the A final, competing for medals through 8th place. The swimmers with the next 8 times in the semifinals competed in the B final for 9th through 16th place. Swim-offs were used as necessary to determine advancement.

Records

Prior to this competition, the existing world and Olympic records were as follows.

No new world or Olympic records were set during the competition. Gustavo Borges set a new South American area record, and two national records were set: the Russian record by Alexander Popov and the Puerto Rican record by Ricardo Busquets.

Schedule

All times are Central European Summer Time (UTC+2)

Results

Heats

Rule: The eight fastest swimmers advance to final A (Q), while the next eight to final B (q).

Finals

Final B

Final A

Popov won, well ahead of everyone else. An equipment error resulted in the scoreboard initially displaying Caron as the second-place swimmer and Borges as last. Borges last was an obvious mistake to anyone watching; he had been fighting for second. His touchpad had malfunctioned. Officials reviewed film of "his" finish, assigning him a time of 49.53—equal to Biondi; they then realized that the film had been of Biondi. Looking at the correct finish, the officials gave Borges a time of 49.43, good for the silver medal.

References

External links
 Official Report

Swimming at the 1992 Summer Olympics
Men's events at the 1992 Summer Olympics